Leprocaulon beechingii is a species of saxicolous (rock-dwelling), leprose lichen in the family Leprocaulaceae. Found in the southern Appalachian Mountains of eastern North America, it was formally described as a new species in 2020 by lichenologist James Lendemer. Its main distinguishing physical characteristic is the  thallus of the normandinoides-type, with raised, crisp margins. Chemically, it contains the secondary chemical products zeorin and usnic acid. The latter of these substances gives the thallus a greenish-yellow colouration.

References

Lecanoromycetes
Lichen species
Lichens described in 2020
Lichens of the Southeastern United States